In organic chemistry, thioureas are members of a family of organosulfur compounds with the formula  and structure . The parent member of this class of compounds is thiourea. The thiourea functional group has a planar  core.

Structure and bonding
Thioureas have planar  core. The  bond distance is near 1.71 Å, which is 0.1 Å longer than in normal ketones. The C–N bond distances are short. Thioureas occurs in two tautomeric forms.  For the parent thiourea, the thione form predominates in aqueous solutions. The thiol form, known as an isothiourea, can be encountered in substituted compounds such as isothiouronium salts.

Synthesis
N,N′-unsubstituted thioureas can be prepared by treating the corresponding cyanamide with hydrogen sulfide or similar sulfide sources. Organic ammonium salts react with potassium thiocyanate as the source of the thiocarbonyl.

Alternatively, N,N′-disubstituted thioureas can be prepared by coupling two amines with thiophosgene:
2 HNR2 + Cl2S=C -> 2 S=C(NR2)2 + 2 HCl

Amines also condense with organic thiocyanates to give thioureas:
HNR2 + S=C=NR' -> S=C(NR2)(NHR')

Cyclic thioureas are prepared by transamidation of thiourea with diamines.  Ethylene thiourea is synthesized by treating ethylenediamine with carbon disulfide.  In some cases, thioureas can be prepared by thiation of ureas using phosphorus pentasulfide.

Applications

Precursor to heterocycles
Thioureas are building blocks to pyrimidine derivatives. Thus thioureas condense with β-dicarbonyl compounds. The amino group on the thiourea initially condenses with a carbonyl, followed by cyclization and tautomerization. Desulfurization delivers the pyrimidine.  The pharmaceuticals thiobarbituric acid and sulfathiazole are prepared using thiourea. 4-Amino-3-hydrazino-5-mercapto-1,2,4-triazole is prepared by the reaction of thiourea and hydrazine.

Catalysis
Some thioureas are vulcanization accelerators.  Thioureas are also used in a research theme called thiourea organocatalysis.

References

Further reading

External links
 INCHEM assessment of thiourea
 International Chemical Safety Card 0680

 
Functional groups